Roy Messing (born March 4, 1958, in Roslyn, New York) is a retired American soccer goalkeeper who played in both the North American Soccer League and Major Indoor Soccer League. He is currently a Senior Managing Director at Ankura Consulting Group.

Messing, brother of Shep, played college soccer at Yale University.  In 1978, Messing signed with the San Diego Sockers of the North American Soccer League.  He then played for the Cincinnati Kids of the newly established Major Indoor Soccer League during the 1978-1979 indoor season.  He returned to the NASL in 1979 with the Rochester Lancers.  During the 1980-1981 MISL season, he played for the San Francisco Fog.  However, a blow to the head led to a partially detached retina which put him out of playing for roughly a year.

Messing retired in 1988.  He then attended Yale University, where he graduated with a bachelor's degree before earning an MBA from Harvard University.
Messing ran a goalkeepers camp called "Messing Goalkeeper Academy" in 1988 based in Suffield, Connecticut.

References

External links
 NASL/MISL stats
 Global Sports Group, LLC

1958 births
Living people
American soccer players
American people of Latvian-Jewish descent
Jewish American sportspeople
Cincinnati Kids players
Association football goalkeepers
Hartford Hellions players
Major Indoor Soccer League (1978–1992) players
New York Arrows players
San Francisco Fog (MISL) players
Rochester Lancers (1967–1980) players
Soccer players from New York (state)
Yale Bulldogs men's soccer players
People from Roslyn, New York
Harvard Business School alumni
Major Indoor Soccer League (1978–1992) commentators
The Wheatley School alumni